Gottaï (also written El Gottaï) is a village in the commune of Magrane, El Oued Province, Algeria.

It is a "minor place", with "indefinite borders".

References

Neighbouring towns and cities

Populated places in El Oued Province